This is a list of Bundesliga hat-tricks. Since its creation, more than fifty players have scored at least one hat-trick. Gerd Müller has scored 32 Bundesliga hat-tricks, making him the player with the most hat-tricks in Bundesliga history. Robert Lewandowski and Mario Gómez share the record for most hat-tricks in a single season with five. Dieter Müller holds the record for most goals in one Bundesliga match with six.

Hat-tricks

Note: The results column shows the scorer's team score first

Multiple hat-tricks
The following table lists the number of hat-tricks scored by players who have scored two or more hat-tricks. Players in bold are still active in the Bundesliga.

Hat-tricks by nationality
The following table lists the number of hat-tricks scored by players from a single nation.

References

hat-tricks
Bundesliga